Cherasco is a comune (municipality) in the Province of Cuneo in the Italian region Piedmont, located about  southeast of Turin and about  northeast of Cuneo.

The municipality of Cherasco contains the frazioni (subdivisions, mainly villages and hamlets) of Bricco de' Faule, Cappellazzo, Meane, Roreto, San Bartolomeo, San Giovanni, Sant'Antonio and Veglia.

Cherasco borders the following municipalities: Bra, Cavallermaggiore, Cervere, La Morra, Marene, Narzole, and Salmour.

The Cherasco Synagogue in the old Jewish ghetto has a notable Baroque Torah ark and bimah.

The Visconti Castle is a medieval one, uilt in the 14th century by Luchino Visconti, Lord of Milan, and partly reconstructed at the beginning of the 20th century.

On 28 April 1796 in Cherasco was signed an armistice between Victor Amadeus III of Sardinia and Napoleon Bonaparte.

Demographic evolution

Twin towns – sister cities

Cherasco is twinned with:
 Villars-sur-Var, France (1981)
 Möckmühl, Germany (2001)
 Piliscsaba, Hungary (2005)
 Cefa, Romania (2006)
 Aksakovo, Bulgaria (2009)

See also 

 BRC Racing Team

References

Sources